Amjad Khan Chowdhury was a Bangladeshi Army officer and founder of Bangladesh conglomerate PRAN-RFL Group.

Early life
Chowdhury was born in Natore, East Bengal, British India on 10 November 1937. He studied in Nabakumar Institution.

Career
Chowdhury joined Pakistan Army in 1956. He was posted in 29 Cavalry as a Major during March 1971 and was sent to West Pakistan after the start of the Bangladesh Liberation War . He joined Bangladesh Army in 1973 after being repatriated from Pakistan, after the Independence of Bangladesh. He served as the GOC of Comilla Cantonment and Bogra Cantonment. He graduated from Pakistan Military Academy and Australian Staff College. He was also the Quarter Master General of Bangladesh Army. He retired from Bangladesh Army in 1981 with the rank of Major General.

After retiring from the Army he founded PRAN-RFL Group. In 1981 he founded RFL (Rangpur Foundry Ltd) to make irrigation pump. In 1985 he founded PRAN to produce agro products. By 2016 PRAN exports to 130 countries and employees 80 thousand people directly. He was the founder president of Real Estate and Housing Association of Bangladesh (REHAB) and Bangladesh Agro-Processors' Association. He also served as the former president of Underprivileged Children's Education Programme.

Death
Chowdhury died on 8 July 2015 in Duke University Hospital, North Carolina, United States from cardiac complications and diabetes. He was buried in Banani Army Graveyard, Dhaka. He left back his wife, Sabiha Amjad, and children Azar J. K. Chowdhury, Ahsan Khan Chowdhury, Sheira Haq and Uzma Chowdhury.

References

Bangladesh Army generals
Bangladeshi businesspeople
1937 births
2015 deaths
Pakistan Military Academy alumni
Bangladeshi chairpersons of corporations